Michael Daly Hawkins (born February 12, 1945) is a Senior United States circuit judge of the United States Court of Appeals for the Ninth Circuit.

Early life and education 

Born in Winslow, Arizona, Hawkins received his Bachelor of Arts degree and Juris Doctor from Arizona State University and Arizona State University College of Law in 1967 and 1970, respectively, and his Master of Laws from the University of Virginia School of Law in 1998.

Professional career 

Hawkins previously had been a partner in the Phoenix law firm of Daughton Hawkins Brockelman Guinan & Patterson while in private practice from 1980 until 1994. He was the United States Attorney for Arizona from 1977 until 1980, and was a Special Prosecutor for the Navajo Nation from 1985 through 1989.  He also served in the United States Marine Corps as a Special Courts Martial Military Judge from 1970 until 1973.  He served in private practice from 1973 until 1976.

Federal judicial service 

Hawkins was nominated by President Bill Clinton on July 13, 1994, to a seat on the United States Court of Appeals for the Ninth Circuit vacated by Judge Thomas Tang. He was confirmed by the United States Senate on September 14, 1994, and received commission on September 15, 1994. He assumed senior status on February 12, 2010.

References

External links
 
 Profile, FindLaw Lawyer Directory
 How Appealing's 20 Questions:  Michael Daly Hawkins

1954 births
Arizona State University alumni
Judges of the United States Court of Appeals for the Ninth Circuit
Living people
People from Winslow, Arizona
Sandra Day O'Connor College of Law alumni
United States court of appeals judges appointed by Bill Clinton
United States Attorneys for the District of Arizona
University of Virginia School of Law alumni
20th-century American judges
21st-century American judges